Education in St. Lucia is primarily based on the British education system and is provided in public and private schools.

The Human Rights Measurement Initiative (HRMI) finds that St. Lucia fulfills 85.2% of what it should be fulfilling for the right to education based on the country's level of income. HRMI breaks down the right to education by looking at the rights to both primary education and secondary education. While taking into consideration St. Lucia's income level, the nation achieves  87.8%  of what should be possible based on its resources (income) for primary education and 82.6% for secondary education.  

Education in St Lucia is compulsory between ages 5 to 15. St Lucia has achieved universal primary education, and universal secondary education. School hours are normally from 9a.m. to 3p.m., with secondary schools starting at 8a.m. and ending at 2:30p.m. There are approximately 74 primary schools in St Lucia, and 23 secondary schools. 

Before its Independence, schools in St. Lucia were managed by different religious denominations, in particular the Roman Catholic Church, the Seventh-day Adventist church, and Methodist churches.

Primary Education 
Following time perhaps spent at pre-school, children enter primary school for 7 years to learn the rudiments of literacy, numeracy and social sciences, from Infant School (Grade K) to Primary School (Grades 1-6). At the end of Grade 6, students write the Common Entrance Examination to determine placement for additional compulsory schooling.

Secondary Education 
Secondary School education follows for those who pass the Common Entrance Examination. Based on their performance, students will enter a designated school according to their 1st, 2nd or 3rd school of choice.  After 3 years, students may choose to either sit the CSEC examinations or continue through to Form 5 then write the exam.

Tertiary Education 
Tertiary education is provided through University of the West Indies (UWI) distance learning programs, and the local Sir Arthur Lewis Community College (SALCC), which is evolving into a degree-awarding institution.

It has 4 Divisions, namely Agriculture, Arts Science & General Studies, Teacher Education & Educational Administration, and Technical Education & Management Studies, and these are undergirded by 10 Departments.

St Lucia has a number of medical schools and universities. The Sir Arthur Lewis Community College is located in Castries, where most St Lucians go to further their studies. The literacy rate in St Lucia is estimated to be 90%.

References

 
Society of Saint Lucia